Living Dead Girl is a young adult novel written by Elizabeth Scott. The story follows a girl called "Alice" who has been kidnapped by a pedophile named Ray.

Synopsis
This book takes place five years after "Alice's" abduction. She is now 15, and is still living with Ray, her abductor. They pose as father and daughter, though they have no connections to anyone in the outside world. During this time, he has deprived her of food in order to keep her frozen in her childlike body, dresses her in childlike clothing, and has raped her every day. Ray also makes her sit in a chair as punishment when she is "bad". Alice refers to herself as the "Living Dead Girl": She is numb on the inside and is looking forward to the day when Ray will finally kill her, like he did the girl that he had abducted before her, the "First Alice". Ray had kept the First Alice until she was fifteen and her body had begun to mature. He then killed her and dumped her body, which was later found, but he had never been suspected. 

Alice now hopes for death, rather than for escape. Since the day he had taken her, he had threatened that if she ever ran from him or tried to contact police, he would kill her parents. By now, he has completely brainwashed her: she says, "I could run, but he would find me. He would take me back to 623 Daisy Lane and make everyone who lives there pay. He would make everyone there pay even if he didn't find me. I belong to him. I'm his little girl. All I have to do is be good." So she "stays in line" even though she is left at their apartment alone all day while he is at work, and even goes to get bikini waxes done by herself.

One day, Ray tells Alice he wants her to find him a "New Alice" for him. At first, Alice hopes that if she does, he will free her, or at least finally put her out of her misery. Instead, Ray tells her that she will train the new Alice to his liking.

Alice takes trips down to the park where Ray had taken her once before and watches the young girls who play there. She writes down in a little notebook the different girls, what they do, and what they look like. She returns to Ray and he asks her to tell him all about these little girls. On one of her trips there, she meets Lucy, a young girl who likes to swing. After Lucy tells Alice that she doesn't like her, Alice decides that Lucy will be the one to replace her. Alice then meets Lucy's older brother, Jake, a troubled teenager who abuses prescription drugs. Alice returns to his car and has sex with him to try to get some information from him about Lucy. She finds out a little information about the girl's hobbies and schedule. Before she leaves, she also meets a police officer who has a feeling that Alice is in trouble. However, Alice knows that talking to the police will only get her in trouble with Ray, so she refuses to call for help. When Ray accuses Alice of lying to him about Lucy's whereabouts, Alice becomes confused, as Jake told her that Lucy would be at a local swimming pool.

Alice returns later and finds Lucy standing in the park. She tries to tell her to run, but Ray appears and grasps Lucy by the arm. Alice collects her remaining life in her hollow body and shouts for Lucy to run. Ray gets so angry that he tries to strangle Alice. Jake shoots Ray dead, and inadvertently wounds Alice. As she lies dying, Alice tells Lucy that her name is Kyla Davis, and that she lives on 623 Daisy Lane. She then asks Lucy to take her home. Alice's final thought before she dies is "I am free."

Major Characters
Alice — She was kidnapped by Ray, who sexually and physically abused her, and is now in her teens. She feels emotionally numb after suffering years of abuse, and wants only to die. She's charged by her abductor to find and train her own "replacement".
Ray — The antagonist in the book. Ray was sexually abused by his mother as a child and is now taking out his pain by abusing young girls, all of whom he calls Alice.
Lucy — The little girl Alice is planning to bring to Ray. When she tells Ray of her discovery, he renames Lucy "Annabel".
Jake — Lucy's older brother. He promises Alice that he will save her.
Barbara  —  The police officer who questions and talks to Alice at the park.

Reception
In the assessment of Publishers Weekly, "Scott's prose is spare and damning, relying on suggestive details and their impact on Alice to convey the unimaginable violence she repeatedly experiences. Disturbing but fascinating, the book exerts an inescapable grip on readers—like Alice, they have virtually no choice but to continue until the conclusion sets them free." The book also received multiple reviews elsewhere. The novel was also recommended in a range of other fora:
 2010 International Reading Association Young Adults' Choices Pick
 2010 YALSA Popular Paperback
 2010 YALSA Amazing Audiobook
 2009 YALSA Best Book for Young Adults
 2009 YALSA Quick Pick for Reluctant Readers
 2009 Amelia Bloomer Project Young Adult Fiction Pick
 2008 BCCB Blue Ribbon Award Winner
 Cynsations Cynsational Book of 2008

External links
 Elizabeth Scott's website

References

2008 American novels
American young adult novels
Novels about child sexual abuse